Nishada aureocincta is a moth of the family Erebidae. It was described by Hubert Robert Debauche in 1938. It is found on Sulawesi.

References

Lithosiina
Moths described in 1938